Radhika Tamang is a Nepalese politician and deputy speaker of Provincial Assembly of Bagmati Province. She was elected from Nuwakot 1 (constituency) in May 2018.

References

Living people
Nepalese politicians
Members of the Provincial Assembly of Bagmati Province
Communist Party of Nepal (Maoist Centre) politicians
Tamang people
Year of birth missing (living people)
Members of the 2nd Nepalese Constituent Assembly